Air New England was an American commuter airline with service to New England communities during the 1970s. It was headquartered at Logan International Airport in the East Boston area of Boston, Massachusetts.

History
Scheduled service began in 1970 acquiring Cape & Islands Airline  and continued until the company went out of business in 1981.  Air New England holds the distinction of being the first airline certificated by the U.S. Civil Aeronautics Board since Ozark Air Lines in 1950. In the days prior to the Airline Deregulation Act of 1978, airlines (other than small commuters) were required to operate with a Certificate of Public Convenience and Necessity. Air New England operated principally with a fleet of de Havilland Canada DHC-6 Twin Otter and Fairchild Hiller FH-227 turboprop aircraft.

ANE was formed in November 1970 by Joseph Whitney, Nelson Lee, formerly of Executive Airlines and George Parmenter of Cape and Island Airways. Based in Hyannis, MA, they operated Beech 18s and a Twin Otter around the Cape and Islands, Boston and La Guardia. They expanded in 1971 with the first of 6 DC-3s. 1972 and 1973 saw more expansion with additional Twin Otters and Beech 99 turboprops. The Beech 18s were retired at this point. By 1974 the airline had expanded into Maine, Vermont, New York and would fly to all six New England states by 1978. In 1975 Air New England received Part 121 certification and added FH-227s, bought from Delta Air Lines, to the fleet. Additional FH-227s were purchased from Ozark and by 1979, Convair 580 turboprops were added as well. By this time the Beech 99's and DC-3s had been retired. Major expansion outside of the northeast U.S. occurred in 1979 to Albany, NY, Baltimore-Washington and Cleveland, but the handwriting was on the wall as the effects of airline deregulation began to materialize.

Air New England shutdown on October 31, 1981, with 400 employees. The company cited "intolerable financial losses" caused by competition, lack of federal subsidies, cumulative expenses, and a decrease in revenue caused by the contemporaneous strike by the air-traffic controllers' union, PATCO. ANE had been carrying close to 600,000 passengers a year in 1980. In 1981, it depended on $6.1 million in federal subsidies to cover operating costs. During its 12-year existence, the airline suffered only one serious incident/crash [cited below] and had one of the highest safety/reliability ratings of all American based airlines over that 12-year period."

An on-demand charter operator named Air New England based in Fort Lauderdale, Florida, and Portland, Maine, has been operating since 2010.

Destinations

Connecticut
Hartford (Bradley International Airport)
New Haven (Tweed-New Haven Airport)
New London (Groton-New London Airport)
Maine
Augusta (Augusta State Airport)
Lewiston (Auburn/Lewiston Municipal Airport)
Portland (Portland International Jetport)
Waterville (Waterville Robert LaFleur Airport)
Maryland
Baltimore (Baltimore-Washington International Thurgood Marshall Airport)
Massachusetts
Boston (Logan International Airport)
Hyannis (Barnstable Municipal Airport)
Martha's Vineyard (Martha's Vineyard Airport)
Nantucket (Nantucket Memorial Airport)
New Bedford (New Bedford Regional Airport)
New Hampshire
Keene (Dillant-Hopkins Airport)
Lebanon (Lebanon Municipal Airport)
Manchester (Manchester Airport)
New York
Albany (Albany International Airport)
New York (LaGuardia Airport)
Rochester (Greater Rochester International Airport)
Ohio
Cleveland (Cleveland Hopkins International Airport)
Rhode Island
Newport (Newport State Airport)
Providence (T. F. Green Airport)
Vermont
Burlington (Burlington International Airport)
Montpelier (Edward F. Knapp State Airport)

Fleet

 Beech 18
 Beech 99
 Convair 580 (some aircraft leased on a seasonal basis from Aspen Airways) 
 de Havilland Canada DHC-6 Twin Otter
 Douglas DC-3
 Fairchild Hiller FH-227

Accidents and incidents
On 17 June 1979, an Air New England de Havilland Twin Otter aircraft crashed while approaching Barnstable Municipal Airport in Hyannis, Massachusetts. One person, the pilot, was killed.

See also
 List of defunct airlines of the United States

References

External links
CapeCodTimes.com
AirTimes.com

 
Defunct airlines of the United States
Airlines established in 1970
Companies based in Boston
Defunct companies based in Massachusetts
1970 establishments in Massachusetts
Airlines disestablished in 1981
1981 disestablishments in Massachusetts
Airlines based in Massachusetts
Logan International Airport